The 1983 NSWRFL season was the 76th season of professional rugby league football in Australia. Fourteen teams competed for the J J Giltinan Shield and Winfield Cup during the season, which culminated in a replay of the previous year's grand final between the Parramatta and Manly-Warringah clubs. During the season, NSWRFL teams also competed for the 1983 KB Cup.

1983 was the final season in the New South Wales Rugby Football League premiership for Sydney-based foundation club Newtown Jets, and the first reduction in the number of teams in the competition since Sydney University’s departure at the end of the 1937 NSWRFL season. It was also the first season that was played with four-point tries.

Season summary
For the first time, the number of points awarded for scoring a try was raised from three to four. There was also the introduction of a handover if a team was caught in possession six times, which had the effect of killing the traditional scrum but attracted many new followers to a game that had seen attendances decline by fifty percent since the record year of 1968. To counter a lucrative illegal betting market, legal betting via FootyTAB was introduced and was a regarded as a success.

Twenty-six regular season rounds were played from February till August, resulting in a top five of Manly-Warringah, Parramatta, Canterbury-Bankstown, Balmain and St. George, who battled it out in the finals. Manly-Warringah managed 23 wins from 28 matches in 1983 – at the time the most wins in a season by a club in NSWRFL premiership history alongside Parramatta’s 23 in 1982.

The 1983 season's Rothmans Medallist was Eastern Suburbs’ back, Michael Eden and the Dally M Award went to Western Suburbs’ half, Terry Lamb. Rugby League Week gave their player of the year award to Manly-Warringah winger, Phil Sigsworth. This season the Cocal-Cola Coach-of-the-year award was voted for by the coaches in the League and was awarded to rookie coach Laurie Freier.

This was also the last year in the first-grade competition for foundation club Newtown, who were dropped at the season’s end.

Teams
The lineup of teams remained unchanged from the previous season, with fourteen clubs competing in total, including six Sydney-based foundation teams, another six from Sydney, one from greater New South Wales and one from the Australian Capital Territory. It was the last season for the Newtown club.

Ladder

Finals

Chart

Grand final

Parramatta powered over Manly for the second year straight to claim their third successive title. The 18-6 win saw Brett Kenny claim a unique achievement in scoring two tries in three successive grand finals. Kenny opened the scoring and the Eels raced to a 10-0 lead after 13 minutes when Eric Grothe steamrolled burly Manly fullback Graham Eadie.

Parramatta 18 (Tries: Brett Kenny 2, Eric Grothe; Goals: Cronin 3)

defeated

Manly-Warringah 6 (Tries: Phil Sigsworth; Goals: Graham Eadie)

Player statistics
The following statistics are as of the conclusion of Round 26.

Top 5 point scorers

Top 5 try scorers

Top 5 goal scorers

References

External links
Rugby League Tables - Season 1983 The World of Rugby League
Results: 1981-90 at rabbitohs.com.au
1983 J J Giltinan Shield and Winfield Cup at rleague.com
NSWRFL season 1983 at rugbyleagueproject.org

New South Wales Rugby League premiership
NSWRFL season